James Chu is a Taiwanese-American businessman who founded ViewSonic, one of the largest brands in computer monitors.

Chu was born October 23, 1957 in the town of Pingtung in southern Taiwan. His father was enlisted in the Nationalist Air Force, and his mother was a housewife. He is the fifth of six children.

Chu studied at the Department of Sociology at Tunghai University but dropped out before graduation.

Chu moved to California in 1986 to become the president of U.S. operations at a Taiwanese keyboard manufacturer.

ViewSonic

In 1987, Chu launched Keypoint Technology Corporation, a distribution company specializing in computer peripherals. Chu introduced the ViewSonic brand of computer monitors in 1990 and renamed the company ViewSonic in 1993.

ViewSonic would go on to become one of the largest brands in monitors and in 1999 had 6.9% of the market share in the U.S., ranking 5th nationwide behind competitors Dell, Compaq, Gateway and Hewlett-Packard.

References

Living people
American people of Chinese descent
American people of Taiwanese descent
American technology company founders
1957 births